East Marion–Belvedere Park Historic District is a national historic district located at Shelby, Cleveland County, North Carolina.  It encompasses 123 contributing buildings in a residential section of Shelby.  The houses date between about 1921 and 1952, and include representative examples of Colonial Revival and Bungalow / American Craftsman architectural styles.

It was listed on the National Register of Historic Places in 2002.

Gallery

References

Historic districts on the National Register of Historic Places in North Carolina
Colonial Revival architecture in North Carolina
Buildings and structures in Cleveland County, North Carolina
National Register of Historic Places in Cleveland County, North Carolina